Malgorzata Gryniewicz, also known as Eleonora Gryniewicz (born on 8 December 1985 in Łódź) is a Polish film director of feature and documentary films, journalist, and casting director. The owner of film and advertising agency Hollylodz Stars HS, in 2001-2012 co-owner of Skysoundtrackstudio in Stockholm.The daughter of the famous Polish sculptor Wojciech Gryniewicz. At the beginning she wanted to study acting in National Film School in Łódź, later she chose to study direction of a film. In years 2002-2008 she studied direction of a film in The Faculty of The Film and Television Pictures Realization and Photography in the Higher School of Art and Projecting in Lodz.In 2008 she was awarded the Honourable of the Dean for M.A. thesis film. She finished film production in Kulturama in Stockholm. She was the prizewinner of films awards in the country and abroad. 
When she was 26, she moved to Stockholm to do what she loves- to work in films and television productions. She worked for Swedish TV stations: Sveriges Television, TV3, TV4, TV6 in production of the reality-show "Waterwörld",series Solsidan directed by Felix Herngren, in the television programmes "69 saker du vill veta om sex", satirical programmes: "Cirkus Möller" i "Bläsningen". She worked in film sets: Millennium series of the film -Men who hate women on the base of the criminal novels of the Swedish writer Stiega Larssona. In Poland she had her journalist training period in the News TV station - TVN 24, then in 2010 she started a cooperation as an investigative journalist at TVN station. As a film producer of the Skysoundtrackstudio.
Małgorzata Gryniewicz with a piece of work "Danddys with money" reached the top of the Swedish music plebiscite METRO ON STAGE.Gryniewicz graduated from the Film School in Łódź. She began her career working for TVN (Polish National Television).She is the daughter of the artist Wojciech Gryniewicz.

Politics

She is a Polish politician, candidate for the European Parliament for Europa Plus (Poland)
Career in politics:
2012–present: Democratic Party – demokraci.pl - secretary, Łódź Voivodeship.
25.05.2014 -European Parliament -candidate for the European Parliament for Europa Plus (Poland)
16.11.2014 -Civic Platform-Local election in Łódź-candidate
25.10.2015-United Left - 2015 Polish parliamentary election-candidate

Movie awards

2010:"director's best dokument" at Film Festiva in Rychnov nad Kněžnou (for "Treasures Ani K", "Skarby Ani K")
2009:"director's best dokument" at Film Festival "OFF jak gorąco" in Łódź (for "Treasures Ani K", "Skarby Ani K")
2009:"director's best dokument" at Film Festival "KAN" in Wrocław (for "Treasures Ani K", "Skarby Ani K")
2009:"director's best dokument" at Film Festival "Filmowa Góra" in Zielona Góra (for "Treasures Ani K", "Skarby Ani K")
2009:"director's best dokument" at Film Festival in Lądek-Zdrój (for "Treasures Ani K", "Skarby Ani K")
2009:"director's best dokument" at Film Festival "SOFFA" in Olsztyn (for "Treasures Ani K", "Skarby Ani K")
2009:"director's best dokument" at Film Festival "POL-8" in Polanica-Zdrój (for "Treasures Ani K", "Skarby Ani K").
2009:"director's best dokument" at Film Festival "Złote Mrówkojady" in Lublin (for "Treasures Ani K", "Skarby Ani K")
2009: award at Media TV Plus (for "Treasures Ani K", "Skarby Ani K").
2009: award at Film Festival "Solanin" in Nowa Sól (for "Treasures Ani K", "Skarby Ani K")
2008: award at Film Festival "GOFFR" in Gliwice (for "Treasures Ani K", "Skarby Ani K")
2008: award at Film Festival Mediów Człowiek w Zagrożeniu in Łódź (for "Treasures Ani K", "Skarby Ani K")
2007: award at Film Festiva Onet.pl and Kino Polska (for "Älgar i tomteland","Łosie w krainie krasnali")
2006: "director's best dokument" at Film Festival in Prague (for "One way trip")

Music Producer
Skysoundtrack (music producer Malgorzata Gryniewicz, Slawomir Rynkiewicz) in 2011 with "Danddys with money" came to the final in the Swedish music poll METRO ON STAGE

References 

21st-century Polish women politicians
1985 births
Polish film directors
Polish women film directors
Film people from Łódź
Polish journalists
Polish women journalists
Living people
Polish female models
Polish expatriates in Sweden